Greg Phillips (born 26 March 1959) is a former Australian rules football player who played for the Port Adelaide Football Club in the South Australian National Football League (SANFL) and Collingwood Football Club in the Victorian Football League (VFL). He also played 20 interstate matches for South Australia.

Port Adelaide (1976–1982) 
Greg Phillips started his career in 1976 at Port Adelaide and was a key member of their defence during a successful era for the club. At the 1980 Adelaide State of Origin Carnival he was selected in the All-Australian team.

Collingwood (1983–1986) 
Phillips joined VFL club Collingwood in 1983 following his Port Adelaide coach John Cahill to the club. Phillips played four seasons with Collingwood before returning to Port Adelaide in 1987.

Port Adelaide (1987–1993) 
Greg returned to Port Adelaide in 1987. The following year Greg Phillips won the club's best and fairest. Phillips was captain of Port Adelaide from 1991 to the end of the 1993 season, when he announced his retirement. He was a member of eight Port Adelaide premiership sides, in 1977, 1979, 1980, 1981, 1988, 1989, 1990 and 1992

Honours 
In 1980 Greg Phillips was named in the All Australian squad. In 2000 Phillips was selected as a centre half back in Port Adelaide's official 'Greatest Team 1870 to 2000'. In 2020, he was inducted into the Australian Football Hall of Fame.

Personal life 
Philips has 3 daughters with his wife Julie. His youngest daughter Erin Phillips was a member of the Australian basketball team, began playing Australian rules with the Adelaide AFL Women's team in the inaugural 2017 season, and is a two time AFLW best and fairest winner. Other daughter, Amy is married to former AFL player Shaun Burgoyne. Phillips now coaches Virginia Football Club in the Adelaide Plains Football League, whom he has led to three consecutive grand finals.

References

External links 

1959 births
Collingwood Football Club players
Living people
Port Adelaide Football Club (SANFL) players
Port Adelaide Football Club players (all competitions)
South Australian State of Origin players
All-Australians (1953–1988)
Australian rules footballers from South Australia
South Australian Football Hall of Fame inductees
Australian Football Hall of Fame inductees